Staurotypus is a genus of aquatic turtles, commonly known as giant musk turtles, Mexican musk turtles, or three-keeled musk turtles, in the family Kinosternidae. The genus contains two recognized species, which are endemic to Mexico and Central America. Both species are sold and bred as pets.

Species
The following two species are recognized as being valid.
Staurotypus salvinii  – Chiapas giant musk turtle, giant musk turtle, Pacific coast giant musk turtle
Staurotypus triporcatus  – Mexican musk turtle, Giant Mexican musk turtle

Geographic distribution
Both species of the genus Staurotypus are native to Mexico and Central America. S. salvinii is found primarily in Mexico, in the states of Oaxaca and Chiapas, but ranges south into Guatemala, El Salvador, and Belize. S. triporcatus is also found primarily in Mexico, and is more widespread, found in the states of Veracruz, Tabasco, Chiapas, Yucatán, and Campeche, and ranges south into Belize, Guatemala, and Honduras.

Description
Species in the genus Staurotypus are typically much larger than other species of Kinosternidae, attaining a straight carapace length of up to 36 cm (14 in), with males being significantly smaller than females. Typically brown, black, or green in color, with yellow undersides, the carapace is distinguished by three distinct ridges, or keels, which run the length.

Staurotypus turtles exhibit XX/XY sex determination, in contrast to the temperature-dependent sex determination of most turtles.

Diet
Like other musk turtle species, Staurotypus are carnivorous, eating various types of aquatic invertebrates, as well as fish and carrion.

References

External links

Turtles of the World - Staurotypus salvini & Staurotypus triporcatus

Further reading
Goin CJ, Goin OB, Zug GR (1978). Introduction to Herpetology, Third Edition. San Francisco: W.H. Freeman and Company. xi + 378 pp. . (Genus Staurotypus, p. 264).
Wagler JG (1830). Natürliches System der Amphibien, mit vorangehender Classification des Säugthiere und Vögel. Ein Beitrag zur vergleichenden Zoologie. Munich, Stuttgart, and Tübingen: J.G. Cotta. vi + 354 pp. (Staurotypus, new genus, p. 137). (in German and Latin).

 
Reptiles of Belize
Reptiles of El Salvador
Reptiles of Guatemala
Reptiles of Honduras
Reptiles of Mexico
Taxa named by Johann Georg Wagler
Turtle genera